Phalaenopsis stobartiana, also known as 滇西蝴蝶兰 (dian xi hu die lan) in Chinese, is a species of epiphytic plant in the family Orchidaceae. It is endemic to Hainan, China. The specific epithet stobartiana refers to Willliam Culley Stobart. The Stobart family were the principal landowners and colliery owners in the 19th century in England.

Description
This species of miniature epiphytic herb has very short stems, which bear 3-4 ovate-lanceolate, oblong or elliptic, 7–11 cm long and 3-3.4 cm wide leaves. The leaves are deciduous, but are present at anthesis. In May to June 2–4 widely opening flowers with green sepals and petals, rose coloured column and labellum are produced on 1-2 ascending, 7–37 cm long, axillary racemes. The plants have massive root systems.

Ecology
This species occurs epiphytically on tree trunks in forests at elevations of 1300–1400 m above sea level.

Taxonomy
Phalaenopsis stobartiana is closely related to Phalaenopsis natmataungensis, from which it differs through plain coloured petals and sepals, as well as morphological details of the labellum. The petals and sepals of Phalaenopsis natmataungensis are mottled.

Horticulture
Promising hybrids have been made in Japan. It may be used to create green-flowering Phalaenopsis. Under inclusion of its synonym Phalaenopsis hainanensis, the International Orchid Register of the Royal Horticultural Society lists 23 registered hybrids involving Phalaenopsis stobartiana.

References

stobartiana
Critically endangered plants
Endemic orchids of China
Taxonomy articles created by Polbot
Taxobox binomials not recognized by IUCN